Ragala Venkat Rahul (born 16 March 1997) is an Indian weightlifter who won gold medal in the men's 85 kg weight class at the 2018 Commonwealth Games in Gold Coast, Australia.

Early life
He was born in Stuartpuram, Guntur, Andhra Pradesh. He trained at Sports School in Hyderabad.

Career
At the 2014 Summer Youth Olympics in Nanjing, he won the silver medal in the 77 kg category. This was India's first ever medal in weightlifting at the Youth Olympics.

He won a gold medal in the men's 85 kg weight class at the 2018 Commonwealth Games in Gold Coast, Australia. He lifted a total of 338 kg - 151 kg in snatch and 187 kg in clean and jerk. It was the fourth gold medal for India in weightlifting at the Games.

References

External links
 
 
 

Living people
1997 births
Indian male weightlifters
Weightlifters from Andhra Pradesh
People from Guntur district
Weightlifters at the 2014 Summer Youth Olympics
Commonwealth Games medallists in weightlifting
Commonwealth Games gold medallists for India
Weightlifters at the 2018 Commonwealth Games
21st-century Indian people
Medallists at the 2018 Commonwealth Games